Ye Htut is a Burmese military officer who previously served as presidential spokesman from 2013 to 2016 and later as minister for the Ministry of Information (Myanmar) from 2014 to 2016 in the Thein Sein's Cabinet. He left the office in 2016 and worked as visiting senior research fellow at the ISEAS-Yusof Ishak Institute in Singapore until July 2019.

Military career
Ye Htut applied to Defence Services Academy but initially failed it first time, so enrolled at Rangoon University. He applied again and accepted for the academy's 22nd intake in 1977. After graduation in 1981, he was dispatched to Kayin State, where he would spend five years fighting the Karen National Union along the Myanmar-Thai border.

Over the next 16 years, he served in Tanintharyi Region, Kayin State, Kachin State and near Naypyidaw, before landing as the chief instructor at a training facility in southern Shan State in 2002. He also contributed articles for the army's Myawady news journal.

In office
He was retired as a lieutenant colonel in Myanmar Army and took up the post of deputy director general at the Department of Information and Public Relations under the Ministry of Information in 2005.  He was promoted as the director general of the department in 2009, which has been viewed as a propaganda machine for the military government.

He became deputy minister for the Ministry of Information in August 2012 when the former minister Kyaw Hsan and deputy ministers were reshuffled to other ministries. He became spokesperson for the President in February 2013.

On July 30, 2014, he was nominated to be Minister for the Ministry of Information. On August 1, the Assembly of the Union confirmed his nomination. He left the office and USDP Party in 2016.

Public image
He is an active Facebook user, has an official account on the social media site where he often shares news from the government and the military and writes his opinions through his Facebook account. He earned the nickname Facebook minister for his frequent use of Facebook.

In 2012, Media reports, particularly those in Eleven Media, suggested that he was behind the blog posts known by the pen name Dr Sate Phwar,  who criticized the legislature for acting above the law. However, he denied that the accusations linking him to Dr Seik Phwar. The Assembly of the Union formed a commission to investigate the identity of Dr Seik Phwar after the blogger wrote an article criticising parliament. The commission's chairman said they found evidence that could implicate him. However, the commission failed to disclose the identity of Dr Seik Phwar, after five months of investigation.

In June 2014, he posted an apology note on his Facebook account after a storm of criticism followed his wife's sharing of a Photoshopped image of opposition leader Aung San Suu Kyi in Hijab. His wife deleted her Facebook account after screenshots of her post were spread by other Facebook users.

Personal life
He married Khin Sandar Tun. His father, Shwe Than, was formerly the Chief of Burma Police Force and a People's Assembly representative during the socialist era. Ye Htut is a brother-in-law of Zeya Aung, a former government minister and military officer.

References

External links
Official Facebook

Government ministers of Myanmar
Burmese military personnel
People from Yangon
Living people
Defence Services Academy alumni
Union Solidarity and Development Party politicians
1959 births